Dynamic set may refer to:

 A set (abstract data type) that supports insertion and/or deletion of elements
 Dynaset- A data structure frequently used in relational database access